The Porter-Leath House is a historic house in Memphis, Tennessee, USA. It has also been known as the Porter Leath Children's Center, which was originally chartered in 1850 as the Protestant Widows' and Orphans' Asylum. It was named after Dr David Tinsley Porter after he made a donation to the asylum in 1904. In 1951, it was renamed the Porter-Leath Home. Portions of the house were built in 1856, 1875, 1912, 1927 and 1929. The 1875 portion was designed by the architect E. C. Jones. It has been listed on the National Register of Historic Places since May 8, 1979.

References

Houses on the National Register of Historic Places in Tennessee
Italianate architecture in Tennessee
Mission Revival architecture in Tennessee
Houses completed in 1856
Houses in Memphis, Tennessee